Jules César, French for Julius Caesar, may refer to:
Chaussée Jules César, a Roman road in modern-day France

People with the given names
Cesar van Loo or Jules César Denis van Loo (1743–1821), French painter
Marie Jules César Savigny (1777–1851), French zoologist

See also
Cesar (disambiguation)
Giulio Cesare (disambiguation), the Italian form
Jules
Julio Cesar (disambiguation), the Spanish and Portuguese form
Julius Caesar (disambiguation)